Tayfun Korkut (born 2 April 1974) is a football  manager and former player. He was most recently the head coach of Hertha BSC. Born in Germany, he represented the Turkey national team internationally.

International career
Korkut earned 42 caps and one goal for the Turkey national team. He represented his country at the UEFA Euro 1996 and UEFA Euro 2000.

Managerial career

Early career
Korkut worked as a coach for Real Sociedad U19, 1899 Hoffenheim U17 and VfB Stuttgart U19 before serving as an assistant coach for the Turkey national team. He received the UEFA Pro License from the Cologne Sports Academy.

Hannover 96
Korkut was appointed head coach of Hannover 96 on 31 December 2013. He became the second Turkish Bundesliga head coach ever, after Özcan Arkoç. His first match was a 3–1 win against VfL Wolfsburg on 25 January 2014. Hannover finished the 2013–14 season in 10th place. Hannover started the 2014–15 season. He was sacked on 20 April 2015. His final match was a 4–0 loss to Bayer Leverkusen. Hannover were in 15th place at the time of the sacking. He finished with a record of 15 wins, 11 draws, and 22 losses.

1. FC Kaiserslautern
On 17 June 2016, Korkut was selected as the head coach of 1. FC Kaiserslautern. He resigned on 27 December 2016. He finished with a record of four wins, seven draws, and seven losses.

Bayer Leverkusen
On 6 March 2017, Korkut was appointed the new coach of Bayer Leverkusen until the end of the season. One week before the end of the season, it was decided that Korkut's contract would not be extended. He finished with a record of two wins, six draws, and four losses.

VfB Stuttgart
On 29 January 2018, Korkut was appointed coach of VfB Stuttgart. In June 2018, he extended his contract with Stuttgart until June 2020. He was sacked on 7 October 2018.

Hertha BSC
On 29 November 2021, Korkut was named head coach of Hertha BSC. He was sacked on 13 March 2022, after only 13 league games in charge, where Hertha gained a meagre nine points, dropping into the relegation zone.

Personal life
Korkut is fluent in Turkish, German, Spanish and English.

Career statistics

Scores and results list Turkey's goal tally first, score column indicates score after each Korkut goal.

Managerial statistics

References

External links

1974 births
Living people
Footballers from Stuttgart
Turkish footballers
Turkish men's futsal players
Turkish football managers
Turkey international footballers
Turkey under-21 international footballers
German footballers
German people of Turkish descent
UEFA Euro 1996 players
UEFA Euro 2000 players
Turkish expatriate footballers
Stuttgarter Kickers players
Fenerbahçe S.K. footballers
Beşiktaş J.K. footballers
Gençlerbirliği S.K. footballers
La Liga players
Turkish expatriate sportspeople in Spain
Expatriate footballers in Spain
Real Sociedad footballers
RCD Espanyol footballers
Expatriate football managers in Germany
Bundesliga managers
2. Bundesliga managers
Hannover 96 managers
1. FC Kaiserslautern managers
Bayer 04 Leverkusen managers
VfB Stuttgart managers
Hertha BSC managers
Süper Lig players
Turkish expatriate football managers
German expatriate football managers
People named in the Panama Papers
Association football midfielders
Expatriate football managers in Spain